Yeməzli may refer to:

Aşağı Yeməzli, Azerbaijan
Orta Yeməzli, Azerbaijan
Yuxarı Yeməzli, Azerbaijan